Bargalino is a rural locality (a settlement) in Muysky District, Republic of Buryatia, Russia. The population was 3 as of 2010. There is 1 street.

Geography 
Bargalino is located 72 km northeast of Taksimo (the district's administrative centre) by road. Muya is the nearest rural locality.

References 

Rural localities in Muysky District